Pierre Mankowski (born 5 November 1951) is a French former football striker who later became a coach. He is of Polish descent.

Mankowski is currently a football advisor at Scottish club Caledonian Braves.

External links
Profile

References

1951 births
Living people
French footballers
Association football forwards
Ligue 1 players
Amiens SC players
RC Lens players
French football managers
Stade Malherbe Caen managers
Le Havre AC managers
RC Strasbourg Alsace managers
Lille OSC managers
AS Saint-Étienne managers
Ligue 1 managers
French people of Polish descent
SC Hazebrouck players
France national under-21 football team managers
Sportspeople from Amiens
Footballers from Hauts-de-France